Amitava Roy (born 16 March 1953) is an Indian former cricketer. He played eleven first-class matches for Bengal between 1972 and 1975.

See also
 List of Bengal cricketers

References

External links
 

1953 births
Living people
Indian cricketers
Bengal cricketers
Cricketers from Kolkata